Siayan, officially the Municipality of Siayan (Subanen: Benwa Siayan; Chavacano: Municipalidad de Siayan), is a 2nd class municipality in the province of Zamboanga del Norte, Philippines. According to the 2020 census, it has a population of 36,236 people.

Geography

Barangays
Siayan is politically subdivided into 22 barangays.

Climate

Demographics

Economy
GMA 7 reporter Kara David did a documentary on the economic situation of Siayan. Poverty incidence in the town is 97.5% since 3 out of 4 earn an annual income of more than a dollar a month or 5,000.

References

External links
 Siayan Profile at PhilAtlas.com
 [ Philippine Standard Geographic Code]
Philippine Census Information

Municipalities of Zamboanga del Norte